"Girls Like That (Don't Go For Guys Like Us)" is the first single from Loverama, the fifth album by Custard. It reached #52 on the Australian ARIA singles chart, and spent 24 weeks in the top 100.  The song was placed #3 in the 1998 Hottest 100. 

The Andrew Lancaster and David McCormack directed music video won the ARIA Award for Best Video at the ARIA Music Awards of 1999.

Track listing

Charts

References

1998 singles
Custard (band) songs
1998 songs
Song recordings produced by Magoo (Australian producer)